George Booth Post (September 29, 1906 – March 26, 1997) was an American watercolorist and art educator. He was an important contributor of the California style watercolor movement (also known as the California School of watercolor, part of the California Scene Painting school) of the mid 1920s until the mid 1950s.

Biography
Post was born as George Booth Root III at his grandfather's home in San Francisco, California. He spent several years in Gold Hill, Nevada with his mother and stepfather Walter Post, then returned to California to live in Oakland. In 1921, he received a scholarship to study at the California School of Fine Arts (CSFA) now called the San Francisco Art Institute. His teachers were Gottardo Piazzoni, Otis Oldfield, Ray Boynton, Eric Spencer Macky, and Constance Lillian Jenkins Macky. Post was a long time faculty member at California College of Arts and Crafts. He died of pneumonia in San Francisco, California at age 91.

References

External links
Collection Summary: An interview of George Booth Post conducted 1964 Apr. 9, by Lewis Ferbraché, for the Archives of American Art.
George Post biography provided courtesy of “California Watercolors 1850-1970”
California Watercolorist; George Post
George Post, Auction records

1906 births
1997 deaths
American watercolorists
Artists from the San Francisco Bay Area
Federal Art Project artists
California College of the Arts faculty
San Francisco Art Institute alumni